Gloving is a form of modern dance which involves the use of fingertip light- emitting diode (LED) lights to accentuate fun creative patterns.

Gloving performances are called light shows and have become increasingly popular at raves in America. Elements of hip-hop dance including liquiding, finger tutting, and popping have influenced gloving, and many of the same dance concepts and techniques can be applied to the dance form. Prior to gloving, rave attendees twirled glow sticks, and before the addition of LED lights, glovers used plain white Mickey Mouse gloves, which reflected black light frequently employed at shows.

In 2010 an electronic dance music promotions company, Insomniac Events, banned gloving from all its events citing drug connotations and safety issues. Insomniac chief executive officer Pasquale Rotella stated, "Between the fire marshals and the media perception, [gloving] was putting the events in jeopardy and was not helping the health of the culture."

References

Dance culture
Gloves